Acetylcholine receptor subunit beta is a protein that in humans is encoded by the CHRNB1 gene.

The muscle acetylcholine receptor is composed of five subunits: two alpha subunits and one beta, one gamma, and one delta subunit. This gene encodes the beta subunit of the acetylcholine receptor. The acetylcholine receptor changes conformation upon acetylcholine binding leading to the opening of an ion-conducting channel across the plasma membrane. Mutations in this gene are associated with slow-channel congenital myasthenic syndrome.

See also
 Nicotinic acetylcholine receptor

References

Further reading

External links 
 
 

Ion channels
Nicotinic acetylcholine receptors